Back to the City is a live album by the Art Farmer/Benny Golson Jazztet featuring Curtis Fuller recorded at the Sweet Basil Jazz Club in New York in 1986 and originally released on the Contemporary label. The cover photograph was taken at Madison Square Park, Manhattan, New York City.

Reception

Scott Yanow of Allmusic calls the album "Timeless hard bop music".The Penguin Guide to Jazz awarded the album  stars, saying it "features some lesser known items from the band's book, including a rare outing for Farmer as a composer".

Track listing
All compositions by Benny Golson except as indicated
 "Back to the City" - 7:55
 "From Dream to Dream" - 6:49
 "Write Soon" (Art Farmer) - 9:44	
 "Vas Simeon" - 7:31
 "Speak Low" (Ogden Nash, Kurt Weill) - 6:07
 "Without Delay/Time Speaks" - 6:59

Personnel
Art Farmer - flugelhorn
Benny Golson - tenor saxophone
Curtis Fuller - trombone
Mickey Tucker - piano
Ray Drummond - bass 
Marvin "Smitty" Smith - drums

References 

Contemporary Records live albums
Art Farmer live albums
Benny Golson live albums
1986 live albums